Herne – Bochum II is an electoral constituency (German: Wahlkreis) represented in the Bundestag. It elects one member via first-past-the-post voting. Under the current constituency numbering system, it is designated as constituency 141. It is located in the Ruhr region of North Rhine-Westphalia, comprising the city of Herne and the eastern part of the city of Bochum.

Herne – Bochum II was created for the inaugural 1949 federal election. Since 2013, it has been represented by Michelle Müntefering of the Social Democratic Party (SPD).

Geography
Herne – Bochum II is located in the Ruhr region of North Rhine-Westphalia. As of the 2021 federal election, it comprises the entirety of the independent city of Herne and the city districts (Stadtbezirke) of 3 Bochum-Nord and 4 Bochum-Ost from the independent city of Bochum.

History
Herne – Bochum II was created in 1949, then known as Herne – Castrop-Rauxel. From 1980 through 1994, it was named Herne. In the 1998 election, it was named Herne – Bochum III. It acquired its current name in the 2002 election. In the 1949 election, it was North Rhine-Westphalia constituency 53 in the numbering system. From 1953 through 1961, it was number 112. From 1965 through 1976, it was number 111. From 1980 through 1998, it was number 112. From 2002 through 2009, it was number 142. Since 2013, it has been number 141.

Originally, the constituency comprised the independent cities of Herne and Castrop-Rauxel. From 1980 through 1994, it was coterminous with the independent city of Herne. In the 1998 election, it comprised Herne as well as the Stadtteile of Bergen and Hiltrop from the independent city of Bochum. It acquired its current borders in the 2002 election.

Members
The constituency has been held by the Social Democratic Party (SPD) during all but two Bundestag terms since its creation. It was first represented by Heinrich Imig of the SPD 1949 until 1953, when it was won by Friedrich Welskop of the Christian Democratic Union (CDU). Ulrich Berger retained it for the CDU in the 1957 election, but Herbert Kriedemann regained it for the SPD in 1961 and served until 1972. Walter Arendt succeeded him and was representative until 1980, followed by Heinz Westphal until 1990. Dieter Maaß served from 1990 to 2002, when he was succeeded by Gerd Bollmann. Michelle Müntefering was elected in 2013, and re-elected in 2017 and 2021.

Election results

2021 election

2017 election

2013 election

2009 election

References

Federal electoral districts in North Rhine-Westphalia
1949 establishments in West Germany
Constituencies established in 1949
Herne, North Rhine-Westphalia
Bochum